General Russell may refer to:

Lord Alexander Russell (1821–1907), British Army general
Andrew Hamilton Russell (1868–1960), New Zealand Military Forces major general
Baker Russell (1837–1911), British Army general
David Russell (British Army officer) (1809–1884), British Army general
David Allen Russell (1820–1864), U.S. Army brigadier general and brevet major general
Dudley Russell (1896–1978), British Indian Army lieutenant general
Lord George Russell (1790–1846), British Army major general
Henry S. Russell (1838–1905), Massachusetts Colored Volunteer Cavalry brevet brigadier general 
John H. Russell Jr. (1872–1947), U.S. Marine Corps major general
William Russell (Virginia politician) (1735–1793), 5th Virginia Regiment brigadier general in the American Revolutionary War
William Carmichael Russell (1824–1905), British Indian Army major general

See also
Attorney General Russell (disambiguation)